Gilles Clément (born at Argenton-sur-Creuse, Indre, France in 1943), is a French gardener, garden designer, botanist, entomologist and writer. He is the author of several concepts in the framework of landscaping of the end of the twentieth century or the beginning of the twenty-first century, including in particular, 'moving garden' (jardin en mouvement), 'planetary garden' (jardin planétaire) and 'third landscape' (tiers paysage).

He has gained attention for his design of public parks in France, such as Parc André-Citroën. In 1998, he was the recipient of France's National Landscape Prize. 
Since 1977 he has developed his own "moving garden" (le jardin en mouvement) at La Vallée, Creuse.

Clément designed the exhibition Environment: Approaches for Tomorrow at the Canadian Centre for Architecture in 2006.

Main achievements
 André-Citroën Park in Paris, with Allain Provost and Patrick Berger 
 Jardins de l'Arche in Paris la Défense,
 Matisse Park in Euralille with Éric Berlin and Sylvain Flipo
 Valloires Garden in Argoules
 Garden of the Château de Blois
 Garden of the domaine du Rayol
 Garden of the Quai Branly museum in Paris, with Jean Nouvel
 Garden of the École normale supérieure de Lyon
 Garden of the Château de Châtenay-en-France
 Garden of the Château de Beauregard, Loire Valley

References

Parc paysager du Château de Beauregard, Loire Valley

1943 births
Living people
21st-century French botanists
French entomologists
French landscape architects
20th-century French botanists